Midgardsblot is an annual extreme metal and folk music festival organized in Borre, Norway. The festival has been organized since 2015 and takes place at the Midgard Viking Centre, museum in a former Viking settlement and the largest burial mound site in Northern Europe. The programme of Midgardsblot includes tours of the area, battle reenactments, documentary screenings, lectures and panel discussions, as well as a Viking village, a Viking market and a games arena for archery, axe-throwing, and other activities.

History 

The first edition of the festival took place on August 20-22, 2015. It saw the live premiere of Einar Selvik's and Ivar Bjørnson's collaboration album "Skuggsjá". Other bands and musicians performing at the festival included Ihsahn, 1349, Myrkur, Solefald, Einherjer, Kampfar, Glittertind, and Thyrfing.

On 25 April 2020, the festival organization announced that the 2020 edition of the festival would be cancelled due to the COVID-19 pandemic.

See also
 Beyond the Gates
 Hole in the Sky

References

External links
 Official Midgardsblot website 
 Official Midgardsblot YouTube channel 

Heavy metal festivals in Norway
Summer events in Norway